DEA Aviation Limited (DEA)  is a small general aviation company based at Retford Gamston Airport in the United Kingdom.

It is a small privately owned company operating in mostly the UK and Europe undertaking ISR, Flight Inspection and Flight path validation missions. In addition, the company carries out a very limited amount of charter work and the transport of small size Dangerous Goods.

DEA Aviation Limited operates its own Aircraft Maintenance facility and holds a Part M Subpart G with ARC privileges as well as a Part 145 Approval.

History
Founded in 2006 by Peter Bondar and Chris Dawes, the company was granted its AOC in 2009 and operations started with one Diamond DA42 aircraft. from 2009 onwards, more aircraft were acquired to fulfil contracts in Europe and Africa to service a growing customer base.

DEA attracted new investors in 2014. Peter Bondar retired and a new team was recruited and in addition to its work with its flight inspection customers, the company rapidly achieved increasing success in the ISR arena operating on the borders of the European Union. In 2017 the company changed its name to "DEA Aviation Limited".

Fleet 

DEA operates only seven Diamond DA42 and one Diamond DA62, all single pilot non-complex piston engine aircraft, in various configurations.

References

 business air news
 Flyingpodcast
 Flyvictor
 Handbook of business aviation
 publicTENDERS.NET
 Police aviation news February 2013

External links
 

Airlines of the United Kingdom